The 2016–17 George Mason Patriots women's basketball team represents George Mason University during the 2016–17 NCAA Division I women's basketball season. The Patriots, led by third year head coach Nyla Milleson, played their home games at EagleBank Arena and were members of the Atlantic 10 Conference. They finished the season 13–17, 6–10 in A-10 play to finish in tenth place. They lost in the first round of the A-10 women's tournament to Duquesne.

2016–2017 Media

George Mason Patriots Sports Network
Patriots games will be broadcast on WGMU Radio and streamed online through Patriot Vision . Most home games will also be featured on the A-10 Digital Network. Select games will be televised.

Roster

Schedule

|-
!colspan=9 style="background:#006633; color:#FFCC33;"| Exhibition

|-
!colspan=9 style="background:#006633; color:#FFCC33;"| Regular season

|-
!colspan=9 style="background:#006633; color:#FFCC33;"| Atlantic 10 Women's Tournament

Rankings
2016–17 NCAA Division I women's basketball rankings

See also
 2016–17 George Mason Patriots men's basketball team

References

George Mason Patriots women's basketball seasons
George Mason
George Mason Patriots women's basketball